On 3 January 2007, a National Express Coaches Neoplan Skyliner N122/3L coach was operating on route 592 and was heading towards Aberdeen. It left Victoria Coach Station at 22:30 (GMT), carrying 65 passengers, and was due to arrive at Aberdeen Coach Park at 10:30 (GMT) on 4 January 2007. The coach was due to call en route at Heathrow Airport, Carlisle, Hamilton, Glasgow and Dundee.

Crash and emergency response
The crash occurred on the motorway slip road connecting the westbound M4 motorway to the northbound (clockwise) M25 motorway, at approximately the point where the slip road merges with the slip road from the eastbound M4.

A total of five fire appliances, twenty London ambulances, eight doctors and one specialist fire service unit attended the accident scene. The injured were treated at six different hospitals. Thirty six passengers were taken to Hillingdon Hospital, sixteen to Charing Cross Hospital, seven to West Middlesex Hospital, four to St Peter's Hospital, one child was taken to St. Mary's Hospital in Paddington, and another child to Wexham Park Hospital in Slough.

Two people were killed in the crash: a 30-year-old male Chinese national, Yi Di Lin, and a woman named Christina Munro Toner, 76, of Monifieth, Dundee. Another passenger, John Carruthers, 78, of Chertsey, Surrey, died on 1 July 2007 from injuries sustained in the crash.

Investigation
The coach was removed from the motorway for subsequent investigation. The police later confirmed that no other vehicles were involved in the accident.

The coach driver was arrested on suspicion of causing death by dangerous driving, but released on police bail. He was named by police as Philip Rooney, of Lanarkshire, Scotland. Following police investigations Rooney was charged with three counts of causing death by dangerous driving.

National Express took its remaining 11 Neoplan Skyliners out of service for safety checks, all of which were operated under franchise by Trathens Travel Services of Plymouth, a subsidiary of Park's of Hamilton. The coaches were relatively new at the time of the crash, having been delivered in October 2006. The vast majority of the National Express fleet comprises single-deck coaches, and its services were not significantly affected by the recall. It was originally reported that the coaches would be stopped where they were, but they were in fact stopped at their destination. Neoplan announced on 5 January that all the coaches had passed their safety checks, with no safety problems or defects being found, and were ready to return to service "as and when the operator wishes".

The driver of the coach initially denied all three charges of causing death by dangerous driving at a hearing at Reading Magistrates' Court. Rooney was bailed to appear at Oxford Crown Court on 8 September 2008 for a committal hearing for trial on 27 October 2008. He subsequently changed his plea to guilty of all three counts of causing death by dangerous driving at a hearing at the Old Bailey. Rooney was again bailed, this time by Mr Justice Gross, until sentencing. On 26 November 2008 at Oxford Crown Court, Mr Justice Gross jailed Rooney for five years.

Oxford Crown Court was told that the coach driver was speaking to passengers via the public address system, making a "safety announcement" while speeding round a bend. One witness described Rooney's control of the coach as he "drove like a man possessed". It was confirmed on the Court record that as a direct result of Rooney's actions, two persons died in the crash, and a further person died on 1 July 2007. Furthermore, four passengers had to have limbs amputated, and many more needed to be cut from the wreckage by firefighters using special cutting equipment. The Court also heard that Rooney had previous speeding convictions, and that he had repeatedly exceeded speed limits on this journey, as proven by tachograph evidence. Rooney's manner of driving, particularly his heavy braking, caused luggage to fall from the overhead baggage racks.

Prosecutor Richard Latham QC told the Court that passengers had reported that the coach was being "driven significantly faster, as if the driver was seeking to make up for lost time". Before the coach left Victoria coach station it had been delayed by half an hour due to the luggage of one family not being able to fit on the coach. The coach clipped one crash barrier and Rooney then lost control of the vehicle. It skidded sideways for some distance before hitting a second crash barrier and finally overturning.

At an earlier Court hearing, it was confirmed that Rooney had five previous convictions for speeding in passenger vehicles. It was also confirmed that he had been disciplined in December 2004 by his employer for "tampering with a speed limiter". On sentencing Rooney, Mr Justice Gross told him and the Court: "No sentence I pass can undo the events of that day and the deaths and injuries that resulted". As well as being jailed for five years, Rooney was also banned from driving for a further three years.

See also
2007 M1 motorway coach accident, a National Express coach overturned later that year.

References

Bus incidents in England
January 2007 events in the United Kingdom
M4 motorway
2007 in the United Kingdom